Eddie Locke (August 2, 1930 – September 7, 2009) was an American jazz drummer.

Eddie Locke was a part of the fertile and vibrant Detroit jazz scene during the 1940s and 1950s, which brought forth many great musicians including the Jones brothers (Hank, Thad, and Elvin), Kenny Burrell, Lucky Thompson, Tommy Flanagan, Barry Harris, and so many others.  He eventually formed a variety act with drummer Oliver Jackson called Bop & Locke which played the Apollo Theater.  He moved to New York City in 1954, and worked there with Dick Wellstood, Tony Parenti, Red Allen, Willie "The Lion" Smith, and Teddy Wilson amongst others.  During this time he came under the tutelage of the great Jo Jones, and eventually became known as a driving and swinging drummer who kept solid time and supported the soloist.  During the late 1950s he formed two of his most fruitful musical relationships, one with Roy Eldridge, and the other with Coleman Hawkins.  His recording debut came with Eldridge in 1959 on "On The Town".  He later became a member of the Coleman Hawkins Quartet in the 1960s along with pianist Tommy Flanagan and bassist Major Holley.  That group made many fine records including the exquisite album "Today and Now", in 1963.  Throughout the 1970s, he played with Roy Eldridge at Jimmy Ryan's in Manhattan, and wound out his career freelancing, as well as teaching youngsters at the Trevor Day School on Manhattan's upper west side.

Eddie died on Monday morning, September 7, 2009, in Ramsey, New Jersey.

Locke appears in the photograph A Great Day in Harlem- first row standing, third from the left. (not including the leg sticking into the frame)

Discography

As leader
 1977: Jivin' With the Refugees from Hastings Street (Chiaroscuro Records) with Tommy Flanagan, Major Holley, Oliver Jackson
 1978: Eddie Locke and Friends (Storyville Records)

As sideman
With Ray Bryant
Little Susie (Columbia, 1960)
With Kenny Burrell
Bluesy Burrell (Moodsville, 1962) – with Coleman Hawkins
With Roy Eldridge
Swingin' on the Town (Verve, 1960)
Happy Time (Pablo, 1975)
What It's All About (Pablo, 1976)
With Sir Roland Hanna
Dream (Venus 2001)
With Coleman Hawkins
 Good Old Broadway (Moodsville, 1962)
The Jazz Version of No Strings (Moodsville, 1962)
Hawkins! Eldridge! Hodges! Alive! At the Village Gate! (Verve, 1962) with Roy Eldridge and Johnny Hodges
Hawkins! Alive! At the Village Gate (Verve, 1962)
Coleman Hawkins Plays Make Someone Happy from Do Re Mi (Moodsville, 1962)
Desafinado (Impulse!, 1962)
 Today and Now (Impulse!, 1962)
Wrapped Tight (Impulse!, 1965)
Sirius (Pablo, 1966 [1974])
With Lee Konitz
Chicago 'n All That Jazz (Groove Merchant, 1975)

References

External links
Scott Yanow, [ Eddie Locke] at Allmusic
 Finding aid to Eddie Locke Photographs of Jazz Musicians at Columbia University. Rare Book & Manuscript Library.

American jazz drummers
Musicians from Detroit
1930 births
2009 deaths
Chiaroscuro Records artists
20th-century American drummers
American male drummers
Jazz musicians from Michigan
20th-century American male musicians
American male jazz musicians
Statesmen of Jazz members